Schenectady may stand for:

 Schenectady, New York
 Schenectady County, New York 
 Schenectady County Airport
 Schenectady City Hall
 Schenectady Locomotive Works